Avegno is a comune (municipality) in the Metropolitan City of Genoa in the Italian region of Liguria, located about  east of Genoa.

Avegno borders the following municipalities: Rapallo, Recco, Sori, Tribogna, and Uscio.

Twin towns — sister cities
Avegno is twinned with:

  Avegno Gordevio, Switzerland

References

External links
 Official website

Cities and towns in Liguria
Articles which contain graphical timelines